"Swept Away" is a song by American R&B singer Diana Ross for her album of the same name. Ross released the song as the album's second single on August 14, 1984 by the RCA. It was written by Daryl Hall, Sara Allen and produced by Hall and Arthur Baker. Ross wrote the spoken lyrics at the beginning of the song and Hall also provided background vocals on it.

The song talked about how the narrator thought she was in love with a special person only to find out that she had just been "swept away" after catching her lover cheating on her sending her into a rage and panic.

Baker had been a club DJ turned remixer who was just breaking into production, and the twelve-inch version became one of Ross' most successful, reaching number one on the Dance/Disco chart. The single also reached nineteen on the US pop singles chart and number three on the R&B singles chart.

Music video
In the sensual music video, directed by Dominic Orlando in Manhattan and on location in Long Island, Diana is seduced by a Frenchman and falls in love with him only to find out, after arriving unannounced in a bar, that he's cheating on her with another French girl in a stylized Apache Dance. She then confronts the man - hitting him repeatedly - who ends up being knocked unconscious by the singer. Later in the video, the Frenchman tries to fight his way back into her life only to have Ross push him from a lighthouse tower into the water. It was one of her most popular videos, and her first to air on MTV.

The music video was blown up to 35mm for projection during Diana Ross' live performances at Caesars Palace in Las Vegas. There's also an extended version of the video edited for the 12" dance club remix.

Charts

Personnel
Lead vocals by Diana Ross
Background vocals by Daryl Hall and Diana Ross
Guitar solo by Daryl Hall
Produced by Daryl Hall and Arthur Baker

See also
List of number-one dance singles of 1984 (U.S.)

References

External links
 

1984 singles
Diana Ross songs
Songs written by Daryl Hall
Dance-pop songs
RCA Records singles
Songs written by Sara Allen
Song recordings produced by Arthur Baker (musician)
1984 songs
Songs about heartache